313 (three hundred [and] thirteen) is the natural number following 312 and preceding 314.

Additionally, 313 is:

a prime number
a twin prime with 311
a centered square number
a full reptend prime (and the smallest number which is a full reptend prime in base 10 but not in base 2 to 9)
a Pythagorean prime
a regular prime
a palindromic prime in both decimal and binary.
a truncatable prime
a weakly prime in base 5
a happy number
an Armstrong number  - in base 4 ( 3×42 + 1×41 + 3×40 = 33 + 13 + 33 )
an index of a prime Lucas number.

References

Integers